Ogeum-dong may refer to 

Ogeum-dong, Seoul
Ogeum-dong, Gunpo